The Power Inside is a 2013 comedy social film developed by Intel and Toshiba. It is Intel and Toshiba's third social film after The Beauty Inside (2012) and Inside (2011). Directed by Will Speck and Josh Gordon and starring Harvey Keitel, Analeigh Tipton, and Craig Roberts, the film is broken up into six filmed episodes interspersed with interactive storytelling that all takes place on the main character's Facebook timeline.

Plot 
Neil, a seemingly normal 20-something, is stuck in a dead-end job and going nowhere in life. Everything changes when a race of planet-destroying moustache aliens needs something inside Neil to help them destroy Earth. Audience members participate by auditioning to join the aliens or the Guardians — a group of highly skilled straight razor-wielding barbers. The story unfolds online, with added content and character interactions on Facebook happening in between episodes.

Cast 
 Harvey Keitel as O’Mansky
 Analeigh Tipton as Ashley
 Craig Roberts as Neil
 Reid Ewing as Devin
 Zack Pearlman as Ari

References 

 INTEL/TOSHIBA LAUNCH THIRD SOCIAL FILM EXPERIENCE, ‘THE POWER INSIDE’
  INTEL AND TOSHIBA RETURN WITH THIRD SOCIAL FILM, “THE POWER INSIDE” AND HARVEY KEITEL
  INTEL AND TOSHIBA FOLLOW UP ‘THE BEAUTY INSIDE’ WITH ALIENT ZOMBIE SAGA ‘THE POWER INSIDE’ SEQUEL TO BIG AWARD WINNER
   DAILY MOTION

External links 
 

2013 films
Films directed by Will Speck and Josh Gordon
Intel
Internet films
Sponsored films
Toshiba
2010s English-language films